Wrightsville is a city in Pulaski County, Arkansas, United States. Its population was 1,542 at the 2020 census. It is part of the Little Rock–North Little Rock–Conway Metropolitan Statistical Area. Located on Highway 365, Wrightsville existed as an unincorporated community for more than a century before it was incorporated late in the 20th century. Since 1981, it has been home to a major Arkansas Department of Corrections facility, which is the principal employer.

Geography
Wrightsville is located at  (34.610434, −92.217113).

Arkansas Negro Boys' Industrial School
The Arkansas Negro Boys' Industrial School (1927-1968) was a juvenile correctional facility for black male youth in Arkansas. A fire in 1959 at the children's dormitory killed twenty-one victims.

Demographics

2020 census

As of the 2020 United States census, there were 1,542 people, 276 households, and 143 families residing in the city.

2000 census
As of the census of 2000, there were 1,368 people, 262 households, and 193 families residing in the city. The racial makeup of the city was 24.12% White, 74.56% Black or African American, 0.07% Native American, 0.29% Asian, 0.29% from other races, and 0.66% from two or more races.  0.29% of the population were Hispanic or Latino of any race.

There were 262 households, out of which 32.4% had children under the age of 18 living with them, 42.4% were married couples living together, 24.8% had a female householder with no husband present, and 26.3% were non-families. 23.7% of all households were made up of individuals, and 8.0% had someone living alone who was 65 years of age or older.  The average household size was 2.86 and the average family size was 3.37.

In the city, the population was spread out, with 16.5% under the age of 18, 13.7% from 18 to 24, 44.0% from 25 to 44, 18.6% from 45 to 64, and 7.1% who were 65 years of age or older.  The median age was 34 years. For every 100 females, there were 250.8 males.  For every 100 females age 18 and over, there were 299.3 males.

The median income for a household in the city was $28,036, and the median income for a family was $32,500. Males had a median income of $26,563 versus $20,000 for females. The per capita income for the city was $9,518.  About 21.5% of families and 22.6% of the population were below the poverty line, including 27.4% of those under age 18 and 28.0% of those age 65 or over.

Economy
The Arkansas Department of Corrections Wrightsville Unit focuses on educational and rehabilitative services, aiding in workforce preparation, substance abuse recovery, and other aspects of re-entry into society for as many as 850 male and 200 female inmates. A 212-inmate capacity boot camp program was administered at the site for first-time non-violent inmates, along with a 50-inmate capacity female work release program, operated by the ADC since 1990. Since 2011, faith based program Pathway to Freedom has served the Hawkins Men unit, and the Hawkins female unit has taken up industry and food services programs. Wrightsville men's unit houses many programs: Agriculture – Beef Production, Forage Production; Arkansas State Police Barracks (located in Little Rock); Braille Program; Canine Unit; GED Program; WAGE job skills; Industry Operations – Graphic Arts, Furniture Manufacturing, and Data Imaging; Reentry Program; Regional Maintenance; Substance Abuse Therapeutic Community Program (TC); Substance Abuse Treatment Program (SATP); and ACI Warehouse vocational program. It is a major employer in the community, with a staff of 169 employees in various fields. The land occupied by the unit formerly housed the Arkansas Negro Boys' Industrial School.

Wrightsville also serves as the city of license for one Little Rock area radio station, KLAL-FM, and the U.S. Postal Service operates the Wrightsville Post Office.

Education
Wrightsville is within the Pulaski County Special School District. It is zoned to Daisy Bates Elementary School, Mills Middle School, and Wilbur D. Mills University Studies High School.

See also 
 List of municipalities in Arkansas

References

External links

 
 
 Millie Brooks Library at Central Arkansas Library System
 

1873 establishments in Arkansas
Cities in Pulaski County, Arkansas
Cities in Little Rock–North Little Rock–Conway metropolitan area
Populated places established in 1873